A United States federal statute honoring Martin Luther King Jr. and his work in the civil rights movement with a federal holiday was enacted by the 98th United States Congress and signed into law by President Ronald Reagan on November 2, 1983, creating Martin Luther King Jr. Day. The final vote in the House of Representatives on August 2, 1983, was 338–90 (242–4 in the House Democratic Caucus and 89–77 in the House Republican Conference) with 5 members voting present or abstaining, while the final vote in the Senate on October 19, 1983, was 78–22 (41–4 in the Senate Democratic Caucus and 37–18 in the Senate Republican Conference), both veto-proof margins.

Prior to 1983 there had been multiple attempts following the assassination of Martin Luther King Jr. to have a holiday created in his honor with Representative John Conyers introducing legislation in every legislative session from 1968 to 1983. In 1979 a vote was held on legislation that would have created a holiday on the third Monday in January, but it failed to receive two-thirds support and was later rescinded following an amendment changing its date.

While attempts were made to have a federally recognized holiday, numerous U.S. states recognized holidays in honor of King. Connecticut did so in 1973. Illinois adopted a commemoration day in 1969, and made it a paid holiday also in 1973. Other states continued to adopt state holidays up through Utah in 2000.

History

National

Prior attempts

During the 90th Session of Congress following the assassination of Martin Luther King Jr. on April 4, 1968, Senator Edward Brooke and Representatives John Conyers and Charles Samuel Joelson introduced multiple bills that would create a holiday to honor King on either January 15 or April 4, but none of their bills went to a vote.

In 1971, Ralph Abernathy, the second president of the Southern Christian Leadership Conference and a close friend of King, submitted multiple petitions to Senator Adlai Stevenson III asking for a national holiday honoring King on his birthday to be created. On February 10, 1971, Senators George McGovern and Jacob Javits introduced a bill in the Senate to recognize King's birthday as a national holiday and issued a joint statement in support of it, but the bill failed to advance. In September 1972, Representative Conyers introduced another bill in the House along with 23 co-sponsors; this was approved by the House Judiciary committee but was not voted on by the full House.

On September 28, 1979, Representative Conyers introduced another bill to create a federal holiday in honor of King, and on October 19, Representative John Joseph Cavanaugh III stated that the U.S. House Committee on Post Office and Civil Service was planning to report the bill to the House floor. On October 23, the bill was reported to the House floor, but Conyers later had the bill delayed on October 30 as he felt that the bill would not reach the two-thirds vote needed for passage, without the addition of amendments that could weaken the bill. Representative Robert Garcia served as the floor manager of the bill and on November 13, the House voted 253 to 133 in favor of the bill, falling short of the two-thirds vote needed for passage. The House voted to amend the bill to move the date of the holiday from Monday to Sunday by a vote of 207 to 191 on December 6, but the bill was rescinded by its sponsors and the Congressional Black Caucus later criticized President Jimmy Carter for not being supportive enough of the bill.

Passage
On July 29, 1983, Indiana Representative Katie Hall introduced a bill to recognize the third Monday in January as a federal holiday "as a day of prayer in King's memory." The Atlanta Constitution argued that declaring the holiday was an inexpensive way to celebrate King's democratic ideals and that it had "been too long about this business already." 

On August 2, the House voted 338 to 90 in favor of the bill, passing it on to the Senate. During the Senate deliberation on the bill, Senator Jesse Helms attempted to add amendments to kill the bill and distributed a 400-page FBI report on King describing him as a communist and subversive, leading Senator Daniel Patrick Moynihan to throw the report on the ground and refer to it as garbage. Senator Ted Kennedy accused Helms of making false and inaccurate statements, causing Helms to attempt to have Kennedy punished for a violation of rules that prohibit senators from questioning each other's honor. Senate Majority Leader Howard Baker only made Kennedy replace the word "inaccurate". The Senate rejected an attempt to kill the vote by a vote of 76 to 12 on October 18 and later approved the bill by a vote of 78 to 22 on October 19. President Ronald Reagan signed the bill into law on November 2, 1983, and on January 20, 1986, Martin Luther King Jr. Day was celebrated as a federal holiday for the first time.

Congressional vote

State

Alabama

In 1973, Coretta Scott King asked the Alabama Legislature to create a state holiday in her husband's memory on the second Monday in January and Representative Fred Gray, a former civil rights activist, submitted a law to create the holiday according to Coretta's wishes, but it was unsuccessful. Hobson City, Alabama's first self-governed all-black municipality, recognized King's birthday as a town holiday in January 1974.

The Montgomery County Commission voted 3 to 2 in favor of giving its employees a yearly holiday in honor of King on December 22, 1980. John Knight and Frank Bray were the first black people to serve on the commission after being inaugurated in November and voted in favor with Joel Barfoot while Mack McWhorter and Bill Joseph voted against it. However, on January 5, 1981, the commission vote 4 to 1 in favor of changing it from a yearly holiday to a one-time observance.

In February 1981, Governor Fob James sent his legislative program to the Alabama legislature which included a plan to decrease the amount of state holidays from 16 to 12, but would also give state employees the option of taking one day off for non-recognized state holidays that included King's birthday or the birthday of any other statesman. On February 13, 1981, Representative Alvin Holmes introduced a bill to create a state holiday in honor of King, but nothing came of it. On September 14, the Mobile County Commission approved a resolution to create a holiday in honor of King alongside an existing holiday honoring General Robert E. Lee with Douglas Wicks, the only black commissioner, submitting and supporting the bill and Jon Archer opposing it due to him favoring reducing the amount of county holidays. In December the Montgomery County Commission voted 3 to 2 against giving county employees a paid holiday in honor of King with Joel Barfoot, Mack McWhorter, and Bill Joseph against it and John Knight and Frank Bray for it.

In 1983, the all black Wilcox County Commission voted to give county employees a holiday for King's birthday while choosing to not observe Alabama's three Confederate holidays honoring Robert E. Lee, Jefferson Davis, and Confederate Memorial Day as well as Washington's birthday and Columbus Day. Representative Alvin Holmes created another bill that would combine Robert E. Lee and Jefferson Davis' birthday for a holiday in honor of King, but later submitted another bill that would only combine a holiday honoring King alongside Robert E. Lee.

On October 21, 1983, Governor George Wallace announced that he supported Holmes' bill to combine Lee and King's birthday holidays. The legislature didn't take action until 1984 when the Alabama House of Representatives voted unanimously in favor of the bill, passed the Senate Governmental Affairs Committee with all six members in favor, passed the Alabama Senate, and Wallace signed the bill into law on May 8, 1984, recognizing Lee-King Day.

Alaska

On April 4, 1969, a resolution honoring King was submitted on the anniversary of his death, but the resolution was rejected by a vote of 10 to 8 in the Senate. Following the federal recognition of Martin Luther King Jr. Day a bill was introduced in the Alaska legislature to recognize it on January 15, 1987, and Governor Bill Sheffield declared it as a holiday on January 20. However, state employees were still required to work on the day leading to a union lead lawsuit that was ruled in their favor and the state was ordered to give $500,000 to its employees for overtime pay.

Arizona

Senator Cloves Campbell Sr. introduced a bill on January 15, 1971, to recognize King's birthday as a state holiday, but it failed to advance. In January 1975, a bill was introduced in the senate to recognize King's birthday as a state holiday, and passed the Government and Senate Rules Committees and was passed by the Arizona Senate, but failed in the Arizona House of Representatives.

In December 1985, Caryl Terrell asked Tempe's city council to recognize King Day, but it was rejected by the Finance and Personnel Procedures committees. On January 18, 1986, 1,000 people marched from the University of Arizona to El Presidio Park to honor King and in support of the recognition of Martin Luther King Jr. Day along with members of Tucson's city council. On January 20, 1986, 5,000 people marched in support of King Day in Phoenix and heard speeches given by Mayor Terry Goddard and Governor Bruce Babbitt who criticized the state legislature for not declaring King's birthday as a state holiday.

On February 7, 1986, the Government Senate Committee voted 4 to 3 in favor of advancing a bill that would create a state holiday in honor of King on the third Monday in January while derecognizing Washington and Lincoln's holidays. On February 19 the senate voted 17 to 13 in favor, but Speaker of the House James Sossaman removed the bill from the agenda after multiple Republicans representatives complained about the bill. The bill was brought back into the house's agenda, but Sossaman stated that it would most likely be defeated and the house voted 30 to 29 against the bill on May 9, 1986. Babbitt circumvented the state legislature and declared the third Monday of January as Martin Luther King Jr. Day as a state holiday via executive order on May 18, although only executive office employees would receive a paid holiday. However, Attorney General Robert K. Corbin stated that the governor did not have the power to declare state holidays and only the state legislature could do so although Babbitt stated that he would not rescind his proclamation and would only do so after a legal challenge.

During the 1986 gubernatorial election former state senator Evan Mecham ran on a platform that included the removal of the holiday that was established via executive order by Babbitt and narrowly won the election due to vote splitting between Democratic Carolyn Warner and William R. Schulz, who had initially run in the Democratic primary, but after dropping out and reentering was forced to run an independent campaign.

On January 12, 1987, Mecham rescinded Babbitt's executive order causing Arizona to become the only state to de-recognize Martin Luther King Jr. Day. The following day presidential candidate and civil rights activist Jesse Jackson met with Mecham at a joint press conference after meeting for twenty minutes and asked him to reinstate the holiday, but Mecham refused and instead called for a referendum on the issue. 10,000 people marched in Phoenix to the state capitol building in protest of the action on January 19. On May 28, 1987, Norman Hill, president of the A. Philip Randolph Institute, gave a speech in Tucson at the state's AFL-CIO convention where he stated that unions should tell conventions to boycott Arizona and stated that Mecham's decision "caters to bigotry and encourages polarization (of the races)". The de-recognition resulted in $20 million in tourist business being lost due to multiple organizations canceling their conventions in protest, although some, like the Young Democrats of America, kept their conventions in Arizona.

On January 19, 1988, the Senate Judiciary Committee voted 5 to 4 in favor of sending a proposal that would let voters decide whether to create a paid holiday in honor of King on the third Monday in January or an unpaid holiday on a Sunday, but the bill was rejected in the Senate. Mecham was removed from office by the senate on April 4, after an impeachment trial for obstruction of justice and misuse of government funds. On April 14, the Senate Government Committee voted 5 to 4 in favor of a bill that would create a holiday in honor of King and combine Washington and Lincoln's holidays, but the Senate voteed 15 to 14 to reject the bill.

Following the failure of the state legislature to pass a bill creating a state holiday for King, Governor Rose Mofford put forward three options that she would look into: issuing the same executive order Babbitt had issued, wait until after the elections to see if there would be a more friendly makeup towards a King holiday, or wait for a special legislative session to include a King holiday in the plan. Mofford later stated that she would wait until after the elections to attempt to create a King holiday. Due to the failure of the governor and state legislature to create the holiday, another movement to boycott Arizona was created with support from Jesse Jackson and Democratic delegates supporting it and planning to perform a demonstration outside of the Democratic National Convention.

The Arizona Board of Regents voted unanimously on September 9, 1988, to create a paid King holiday at the three state universities that would give 20,000 of the state's 40,000 employees a paid holiday. Arizona State University later chose to end its observation of President's Day and replaced it with the Martin Luther King Jr. holiday.

On January 16, 1989, 8,000 people marched in Phoenix in support of the creation of a holiday in honor of King with Governor Rose Mofford, Goddard, and House Minority Leader Art Hamilton speaking. On February 2, the state house voted in favor of a bill creating a paid state holiday, but Senate President Bob Usdane did not take action on the bill until March 30 when he sent it to the Government Senate Committee where it died in committee. Democratic members of the House included the creation of a holiday inside an economic development bill, but the Commerce Committee voted 7 to 6 to separate the bills.

Another bill was created in the Senate that would end Arizona's observation of Columbus Day in favor of King Day and it passed the Senate Judiciary Committee with 6 to 3 in favor. The bill was passed by the Senate and House and signed by Governor Mofford on September 22, 1989. However, on September 25 opponents of the holiday filed with the Secretary of State to collect signatures to force a referendum on the recently passed bill and submitted enough signatures in December.

On March 13, 1990, the NFL had its annual meeting in Orlando, Florida, and one of the items on its agenda was to determine a host city for Super Bowl XXVII. Among the cities being considered was Tempe, and Arizona civil rights activist Art Mobley was sent to the meeting to make sure that the Arizona ballot initiative was a talking point at the discussion. The vote was conducted and Tempe was awarded the game, but committee chairman and Philadelphia Eagles owner Norman Braman warned that if the King Day ballot initiative went against adoption of the holiday, the NFL would pull the game from Arizona and move it somewhere else.

The bill eliminating Columbus Day was titled as Proposition 301 and another bill was passed by the legislature that would combine Washington and Lincoln's Birthdays and create a King Day was titled as Proposition 302. On November 6, 1990, both referendums were defeated with Proposition 301 being defeated in a landslide due to more effort being spent on Proposition 302 which was narrowly defeated by 50.83% to 49.17%. In March 1991 the house and senate passed a bill that would place a referendum on the creation of a King state holiday onto the 1992 ballot in an attempt to keep the Super Bowl in Arizona. On March 19, 1991, NFL owners voted to remove the 1993 Super Bowl from Phoenix due to the rejection of both referendums. It was estimated that the state lost at least $200 million in revenue from Super Bowl lodging and $30 million from the numerous convention boycotts. On November 3, 1992, Proposition 300 was passed with 61.33% to 38.67% and Super Bowl XXX was later held in Tempe, Arizona in 1996.

{| border="1" cellpadding="4" cellspacing="0" style="margin: 1em 1em 1em 0; background: #f9f9f9; border: 1px #aaa solid; border-collapse: collapse; font-size: 95%;"
|- style="background:#e9e9e9;"
! colspan="7" | 1990 Proposition 301 Results
|-  style="background:#eee; text-align:center;"
! colspan="2"|Choice
! style="width: 5em" |Votes
! style="width: 7em" |Percentage
|-
! style="background:#f33; width:3px;"|
| style="width: 130px" | No
| style="text-align:right;"| 768,763
| style="text-align:right;"| 75.36%
|-
! style="background:#0f0; width:3px;"|
| style="width: 130px" | Yes
| style="text-align:right;"| 251,308
| style="text-align:right;"| 24.64%
|-  style="background:#eee; text-align:right;"
| colspan="2"| Totals
|| 1,020,071
|| 100.00%
|-

{| border="1" cellpadding="4" cellspacing="0" style="margin: 1em 1em 1em 0; background: #f9f9f9; border: 1px #aaa solid; border-collapse: collapse; font-size: 95%;"
|- style="background:#e9e9e9;"
! colspan="7" | 1990 Proposition 302 Results
|-  style="background:#eee; text-align:center;"
! colspan="2"|Choice
! style="width: 5em" |Votes
! style="width: 7em" |Percentage
|-
! style="background:#f33; width:3px;"|
| style="width: 130px" | No
| style="text-align:right;"| 535,151
| style="text-align:right;"| 50.83%
|-
! style="background:#0f0; width:3px;"|
| style="width: 130px" | Yes
| style="text-align:right;"| 517,682
| style="text-align:right;"| 49.17%
|-  style="background:#eee; text-align:right;"
| colspan="2"| Totals
|| 1,052,833
|| 100.00%
|-

{| border="1" cellpadding="4" cellspacing="0" style="margin: 1em 1em 1em 0; background: #f9f9f9; border: 1px #aaa solid; border-collapse: collapse; font-size: 95%;"
|- style="background:#e9e9e9;"
! colspan="7" | 1992 Proposition 300 Results
|-  style="background:#eee; text-align:center;"
! colspan="2"|Choice
! style="width: 5em" |Votes
! style="width: 7em" |Percentage
|-
! style="background:#0f0; width:3px;"|
| style="width: 130px" | Yes
| style="text-align:right;"| 880,488
| style="text-align:right;"| 61.33%
|-
! style="background:#f33; width:3px;"|
| style="width: 130px" | No
| style="text-align:right;"| 555,189
| style="text-align:right;"| 38.67%
|-  style="background:#eee; text-align:right;"
| colspan="2"| Totals
|| 1,435,677
|| 100.00%
|-

Arkansas

In February 1983, the Arkansas House of Representatives and the Arkansas Senate before being signed into law by Governor Bill Clinton allowing state employees to choose to take a holiday off on Martin Luther King Jr., Robert E. Lee, or their own birthday. In 1985, the state legislature voted to combine King and Lee's birthdays and stayed combined until March 14, 2017, when Governor Asa Hutchinson signed a bill separating the holidays.

Connecticut

A bill to recognize King's birthday as a holiday was passed by both the Connecticut House of Representatives and Connecticut Senate in 1971, but was vetoed by Governor Thomas Meskill, who had initially supported the bill, citing the cost of having another paid holiday with it being around $1.3 million. The bill was reintroduced by Representative Irving J. Stolberg in 1972, and it passed in the senate again, but was defeated in the house. Governor Meskill issued a proclamation in 1973 recognizing King's birthday and Representative Maragaret Morton, the first black women in the state assembly, later introduced a bill to create a holiday in honor of King, but it was shelved by the General Law Committee as they felt that Meskill would veto it again.

Supporters of the King holiday created a petition and it had received enough signatures from legislators in February 1973 to force public hearings on a bill for the holiday. Although the law initially put forward by the petition failed, an amended version passed the house 124 to 17 in favor and the senate with unanimity, and Governor Meskill signed it into law on June 14, 1973, making Connecticut the first state to recognize a holiday in honor of Martin Luther King Jr.

On March 4, 1976, Governor Ella Grasso stated that she would support moving the holiday from the second Sunday to January 15. The state legislature passed a bill to change the holiday's date and make it a paid holiday, and Grasso signed the bill on May 4, 1976, making the holiday fall on January 15 and as a paid holiday for Connecticut's 40,000 state employees.

Illinois

Harold Washington, a state representative from the 26th district, introduced a bill to create a holiday in honor of Martin Luther King Jr. in 1969. The House executive committee voted to advance the bill, both state legislative chambers voted in favor of the bill and Governor Richard B. Ogilvie signed the bill creating a commemorative holiday in honor of King that would allow school services to be held in his honor.

Washington proposed a bill in 1970 to make the commemorative holiday a paid legal holiday but was unsuccessful. Washington reintroduced the bill in 1971, and it passed the house with 121 to 15 in favor and the senate with 37 to 7 in favor, but was vetoed by Governor Ogilvie. The Chicago Public Schools system started to observe King's birthday in 1972.

In January 1973, Washington, Susan Catania, and Peggy Martin reintroduced the bill in the Illinois House of Representatives. On April 4, the House voted 114 to 15 in favor of the bill, the Illinois Senate later voted in favor of it as well, and Governor Dan Walker signed the bill on September 17, 1973.

Kentucky

On January 15, 1971, Mayor Leonard Reid Rogers of Knoxville declared a holiday in honor of King in the city. In February 1972, state Senator Georgia Davis Powers introduced a bill that would create a state holiday in honor of King, but it did not make it through the committee although they told Davis to offer an amendment to a holiday bill currently in the legislature. However, Davis was absent when the bill came to the senate, but was able to offer an amendment to another holiday bill although the bill was defeated after her amendment passed.

On January 15, 1974, Powers and Representative Mae Street Kidd proposed bills to create a state holiday in honor of King and both bills passed through each chambers' committees. The Kentucky Senate and Kentucky House of Representatives passed the bill and on April 1, 1974, and Governor Wendell Ford signed it into law. Although the King holiday was not officially paired with Robert E. Lee Day both days would occasionally fall on the same day whenever the third Monday in January was on the 19th.

Governor Julian Carroll declared the first King Day in Kentucky in 1975, but state employees were not given the day off with Carroll citing an economic crisis as the reason.

Maine

On February 13, 1986, a bill to create a paid holiday in honor of King was defeated in the house, but was later modified to make it optional and passed the Maine Senate and Maine House of Representatives before being signed by Governor Joseph E. Brennan and going into effect on July 16, 1986.

Massachusetts

In 1974, members of the Massachusetts Black Caucus introduced a bill to recognize Martin Luther King Jr.'s birthday as a state holiday, but it died in committee. However, the bill was revived by state Senator Joseph F. Timilty who changed it to a half-holiday that would allow businesses to stay open, but governmental offices would close. The bill passed both the House and Senate before being signed into law by Governor Francis Sargent on July 8, 1974.

Missouri

On January 7, 1971, Mayor Alfonso J. Cervantes of St. Louis signed into law a bill that would create a city holiday in honor of Martin Luther King on January 15.

New Hampshire

On February 11, 1999, Jesse Jackson spoke in Portsmouth where he stated that he was considering a presidential run and asked for New Hampshire to recognize a state holiday in honor of King. On April 8, 1999, the Senate voted in favor of a bill renaming Civil Rights Day to Martin Luther King Jr. Civil Rights Day and was later passed by the House before being signed by Governor Jeanne Shaheen on June 7.

North Dakota

Governor George A. Sinner appointed a commission in 1985 to coordinate the state's federal observation of Martin Luther King Jr. Day, but state employees were not given the day off. In 1987, a bill was introduced to recognize it as a state holiday and was passed by the House and Senate before being signed by Governor Sinner on March 13, 1987.

Ohio

On January 14, 1975, Cincinnati's city council recognized a city holiday in honor of King and approved a resolution in support of a statewide holiday bill created by state Senator Bill Bowen. Bowen's bill passed the Senate and House before being signed into law by Governor Jim Rhodes on May 2, 1975.

Wyoming

Representative Rodger McDaniel introduced a bill in 1973 that would create a holiday in honor of Martin Luther King Jr., but nothing became of the bill. Another bill creating a King holiday was introduced in 1986 by Representative Harriet Elizabeth Byrd, but it was rejected. Governor Mike Sullivan signed an executive order in 1989 that would have Wyoming observe a holiday in honor of King only for 1990. On January 2, 1990, the Albany County Commission voted to observe King Day for only 1990.

A bill creating a holiday in honor of King that would end Wyoming's observation of Columbus Day was introduced in 1990. An attempt to change its name from Martin Luther King Jr. Day to Wyoming Equality Day was defeated by a vote of 32 to 29 although it was later renamed as Martin Luther King, Jr./Wyoming Equality Day as a compromise to allow it to pass. The bill passed the House and Senate and Governor Sullivan signed the bill into law on March 15, 1990.

Timeline

Notes

References

External links
 129 Congressional Record (Bound) - Volume 129, Part 16 (July 28, 1983 to August 3, 1983), Congressional Record House August 2 vote roll call pp. 22242–22243
 129 Congressional Record (Bound) - Volume 129, Part 20 (October 5, 1983 to October 20, 1983), Congressional Record Senate October 19 vote roll call p. 28380

Day
Martin Luther King Jr. Day, Passage of
Martin Luther King Jr. Day, Passage of
Holidays and observances by scheduling (nth weekday of the month)
Coretta Scott King